Sarkodie  may refer to:

Sarkodie (rapper), Ghanaian recording artist
Kofi Sarkodie (born 1990s), American soccer player
Kwame Sarkodie (born 1985), American soccer player